Sonnie Ayere is a Nigerian investment banker, Chief Executive Officer of Dunn Loren Merrifield Group, and President of Association of Issuing Houses of Nigeria (AIHN). In 2020, he was awarded as the Investment Banking CEO of the Decade by Banks and other Financial Institutions (BAFI) Awards and 2020 ECOWAS Icon of Societal Development by The West Africa Youth Council for his humanitarian work.

Education 
Ayere studied Financial Economics at the University of Dundee, Scotland in 1993 and also obtained MBA from the Cass Business School, London.

Career 
He started his investment banking career as a Structured Finance Specialist for Sub-Saharan Africa in 2002 and then joined UBA Group Plc between 2005 and 2009 as the director of the investment banking arm  while working under Tony Elumelu before setting out to establish Dunn Loren Merrifield in 2009 (DLM), a financial service company in Nigeria which won the Best Investment Company in Nigeria at the 2014 World Finance Banking Awards and 2020 Banks’ and Financial Institutions (BAFI) Awards as the Most Innovative Investment Bank of the Year Award.

Also in 2012, Ayere was appointed as the inaugural Managing Director of the Nigeria Mortgage Refinance Company (NMRC) and inducted into The Chartered Institute of Public Resources Management and Politics (CIPRMP) 2020 Fellowship Hall of Fame.

References 

Businesspeople from Lagos
Nigerian company founders
21st-century Nigerian businesspeople
Nigerian chief executives
Living people
Year of birth missing (living people)